Raed Zidan is the first Palestinian man to summit Mount Everest and the first Palestinian man to reach all Seven Summits

Early life
Zidan was born in Kuwait to Palestinian emigrants. His parents emigrated from Kufr Lakef, Palestine, near Qalqilya to Kuwait. Zidan, who resides in both the United States and Dubai, UAE is the owner and CEO of Zidan Management Group, and Shock Middle East.

Climbing Mount Everest
Raed Zidan is an accomplished mountaineer and the first Palestinian man to reach all seven of the Seven Summits including Vinson Massif in Antarctica, Mount Kilimanjaro and Aconcagua in Argentina.

On June 1, 2016, Zidan summited Denali in Alaska along with Sheikh Mohammed Al Thani, Masoud Mohammed, and Suzanne Al Houby. The team was known by the name "Arabs with Altitude".

References

Living people
Summiters of Mount Everest
American people of Palestinian descent
Palestinian expatriates in Kuwait
Year of birth missing (living people)